The Woods is a 2011 film written and directed by Matthew Lessner and starring Toby David and Justin Phillips. The script was written by Lessner with contributing writer Adam Mortemore, and additional dialogue by David and Phillips.

The film was co-produced by Lessner, Jett Steiger and Max Knies, and made history as the first film to premiere at the Sundance Film Festival that used Kickstarter for production financing. The film premiered at the 2011 Sundance Film Festival. The Woods premiered in New York at the BAMcinemaFest held at the Brooklyn Academy of Music. The Woods premiered internationally at the Cologne Conference in Cologne, Germany.

Premise
A group of young Americans, disillusioned by the world's many problems, move to the wilds of the Pacific Northwest with hopes of creating their own utopian society. Despite their idealistic goals of revolution, the group comes ill-prepared for their new life, bringing a wide assortment of consumer electronics, recreational vehicles and snack foods. After catastrophic events in the outside world sever their electricity and Wi-Fi, and their leader's once-inspiring rhetoric fails to hold them together, the group is forced to find a way to live in harmony with the natural world.

Cast
 Toby David as Daniel
 Justin Phillips as Dean
 Nicola Persky as Maggie
 Adam Mortemore as Lucas
 Brian Woods as Tanner
 Anne-Sophie as Nadia
 Lauren Hammersmith as Genevieve
 Amanda Furches as Annakate
 Chris Edley as Bryce

Production
The film was filmed over 30 days in Oregon. To make the film, the director and cast lived in a tent-city in the forest.

Music
The film features songs by 
 Dirty Projectors
 Sun Araw
 Lucky Dragons
 Ananda Shankar
 Indian Jewelry
 Lydia Ainsworth

Film Festival/ Film Conference screenings

University/ College screenings

Miscellaneous screenings

References

External links
 
 

2011 films
2011 comedy films
American comedy films
Films set in Oregon
Films shot in Oregon
Kickstarter-funded films
2010s English-language films
2010s American films